ASL Airlines Ireland (ASLI), formerly Air Contractors, is a cargo airline with an extensive operations network. It operates scheduled freight services throughout Europe on behalf of major parcel integrators such as Amazon, FedEx Feeder and DHL Express; and some wet lease services for scheduled airlines. ASL Aviation Holdings DAC, the parent company of ASL Airlines Ireland, is headquartered in Swords, County Dublin, Ireland.

History
The airline was established and started operations in 1972, as Air Bridge Carriers at East Midlands Airport. In September 1992 the name Hunting Cargo Airlines was adopted and in 1997 the transfer of all airline operations to Ireland was completed. In June 1998 the Hunting Group sold its aviation arm to a joint consortium of CMB Compagnie Maritime Belge and Safair (part of the Imperial Group) and the airline was rebranded Air Contractors.

The Imperial Group transferred its 49% shareholding in the company to 3P Air Freighters/Petercam S.A. in 2007.

Air Contractors acquired French carrier Europe Airpost on 14 March 2008. Following the acquisition of EAP into the ACL group of companies, the group was rebranded ASL Aviation Group, representing the three core activities of the group; Airlines, Support and Leasing.

In 2010 Air Contractors entered a new era with the start of passenger flying on a Boeing 737-300 aircraft in conjunction with its Group partner, Europe Airpost.

On 4 June 2015, ASL Aviation Group announced that Air Contractors would be rebranded as ASL Airlines Ireland, Europe Airpost as ASL Airlines France, Farnair Hungary as ASL Airlines Hungary and Farnair Switzerland as ASL Airlines Switzerland.

The company announced on 5 February 2016 that it had agreed to buy TNT Airways and PAN Air, on the condition that FedEx's purchase of TNT goes ahead. The sale went through in May 2016. TNT Airways became ASL Airlines Belgium and Pan Air became ASL Airlines Spain. In early 2017, ASL Aviation Group rebranded as ASL Aviation Holdings.

Subsidiary ASL Airlines Switzerland ceased all operations on 1 February 2018, while ASL Airlines Spain ceased all operations in August of that same year.

Destinations 
ASLI maintains crew bases in 10 European countries and has its own maintenance hangar in Shannon, Ireland. The airline's operations span a network of more than 50 regular destinations across Europe, North America and the Middle East under its own brand name and on behalf of customers such as DHL, Amazon and FedEx.

Fleet

The ASL Airlines Ireland fleet consists of the following aircraft as of June 2022;

In June 2021, ASL Aviation Holdings announced an order with Boeing for up to 20 737-800 Boeing Converted Freighter (BCF) aircraft - 10 firm orders and 10 options at the Paris Air Show. This was extended to an additional 20 737-800 Boeing Converted Freighters (BCF) in March 2022.  ASL's order, including options brings the number of 737-800BCF to 40 aircraft. Eleven aircraft operate for ASL Airlines Belgium, ASL Airlines France, ASL Airlines Ireland and ASL joint venture, K-Mile Asia.

See also
 Transport in Ireland

References

External links

 
 ASL Aviation Holdings

Airlines of the Republic of Ireland
Airlines established in 1972
Cargo airlines
Companies based in Swords, Dublin